Harry Samuel Black,  (born July 30, 1934) is a Canadian humanitarian. He was the Executive Director of UNICEF Canada for 26 years.

Born in Toronto, Ontario, he graduated from Ryerson Polytechnical Institute in Architectural Science in 1957 and McMaster University in 1966. He also did post-graduate studies at York University in 1970. In 1958, he started working for the Red Cross Society in the Blood Donor Service. From 1960 to 1963, he was the Director of the Toronto Blood Depot. From 1963 to 1973, he was the Fund Raising Director for Canadian Red Cross Society. In 1973, he was appointed National Executive Director of UNICEF Canada. From 1979 to 1983, he was an author and editor for UNICEF Communique.

He is the author of the book Canada and the Nobel Prize: Biographies, Portraits and Fascinating Facts (Pembroke Publishers, 2002)

In 2002, he was made an Officer of the Order of Canada.

References

1934 births
Living people
Canadian humanitarians
UNICEF people
McMaster University alumni
Officers of the Order of Canada
People from Toronto
Toronto Metropolitan University alumni
York University alumni
Canadian officials of the United Nations